Addendum is the fifth studio album by American musician John Maus, released on April 20, 2018. It is a twelve-track collection that serves as an "addendum" to his previous album Screen Memories (2017). As Maus explained, "It was really more that I made an album, but then I realized I had two albums worth of stuff." Accordingly, the songs on Addendum were made in a more "carefree" manner than Screen Memories and are most resemblant of his usual style.

Release

Addendum was first issued as a bonus vinyl disc on a career retrospective box set. A standalone CD and digital release followed on May 18. At Metacritic, which assigns a normalized rating out of 100 to reviews from critics, Addendum received an average score of 70 based on 7 reviews, indicating a "generally favorable" reception.

Pitchfork reviewer Evan Rytlewski wrote, "Maus has made more profound and mysterious records, but never one that has taken this much delight in its own ridiculousness." Q magazine called it an "intriguing, if not quite essential, addition to the Maus canon."

Track listing

Note
"1987" and "I Want to Live" are newly mixed versions of tracks that originally appeared on the self-released album I Want to Live! (2003).

References

External links

2018 albums
Albums recorded in a home studio
John Maus albums